Shaker furniture is a distinctive style of furniture developed by the United Society of Believers in Christ's Second Appearing, commonly known as Shakers, a religious sect that had guiding principles of simplicity, utility and honesty. Their beliefs were reflected in the well-made furniture of minimalist designs.

History

Shaker communities were largely self-sufficient: in their attempt to separate themselves from the outside world and to create a heaven-on-earth, members grew their own food, constructed their own buildings, and manufactured their own tools and household furnishings.—Metropolitan Museum of Art

Overview
Furniture was made thoughtfully, with functional form and proportion. Rather than using ornamentation—such as inlays, carvings, metal pulls, or veneers—which was seen as prideful or deceitful, they developed "creative solutions such as asymmetrical drawer arrangements and multipurpose forms to add visual interest." Furniture was made of cherry, maple or pine lumber, which was generally stained or painted with one of the colors which were dictated by the sect, typically blue, red, yellow or green. Drawer pulls for dressers or other furniture were made of wood.

A core business for the New Lebanon Shaker community by the 1860s was the production of well-made "ladder" back or turned post chairs. The minimalist design and woven seats were fast and easy to produce. Furniture built and used by the New Lebanon "believers" is exhibited in the Shaker Retiring Room at the Metropolitan Museum of Art in New York City, which originated from the North Family Shakers' 1818 First Dwelling House. The furniture, acquired in the 1970s, and Shaker textiles are considered among the finest Shaker collections in the world.

Many examples of Shaker furniture survive and are preserved today, including such popular forms as Shaker tables, chairs, rocking chairs (made in several sizes), and cabinets, which are said to have Shaker doors, known for being flat paneled with rail frames. Collections of Shaker furniture are maintained by many art and historical museums in the United States and the United Kingdom, as well as in numerous private collections including the Shaker tilting chair. The underlying principles of Shaker design have given inspiration to some of the finest designers of modern furniture. Shaker ladder back chairs, for instance, deeply influenced the work of an entire generation of postwar Danish designers. Also many ideals of furniture formed around the common Shaker furniture construction.

Notable people 
 Tabitha Babbitt, Shaker toolmaker and inventor
 Ken Hakuta, Shaker furniture collector
 John Kassay, author and expert on Shaker furniture
 Isaac N. Youngs, Shaker furniture and clock maker

Gallery

See also 
 Amish furniture
 Daniel Cragin Mill
 Shaker Shed

References

Further reading
 Andrews, Edward Deming and Faith Andrews. Masterpieces of Shaker Furniture. Courier Dover Publications; June 1999. .
 Andrews, Edward Deming and Faith Andrews. Shaker Furniture: The Craftsmanship of an American Communal Sect Dover Publications. 1964.
 Becksvoort, Christian. The Shaker Legacy: Perspectives on an Enduring Furniture Style. Taunton Press; 2000. .
 Grant, Jerry V. & Douglas R. Allen. Shaker Furniture Makers. Pittsfield, Mass.: Hancock Shaker Village, 1989.
 Grant, Jerry ; Stocks, David & Conran, Sir Terrence. Shaker: Function, Purity, Perfection. Assouline Publishing. New York, 2015.
 Kassay, John. The Book of Shaker Furniture. Univ of Massachusetts Press; 1980. .
 McKinstry, E. Richard. The Edward Deming Andrews Memorial Shaker Collection. New York & London: Garland Publishing, 1987.
 Moore, William D., “‘You’d Swear They Were Modern’: Ruth Reeves, the Index of American Design, and the Canonization of Shaker Material Culture,” Winterthur Portfolio, 47 (Spring 2013), 1–34.
 Paterwic, Stephen J.. Historical Dictionary of the Shakers. Scarecrow Press; 11 August 2008. .
 Rieman, Timothy D. & Buck, Susan L. The Art of Craftsmanship : The Mount Lebanon Collection,Art Services International, and Chrysler Museum (Paperback—Feb 1995).
 Rieman, Timothy D. & Muller, Charles R. The Shaker Chair; Line Drawings by Stephen Metzger, (The Canal Press, 1984) This is the definitive work .

External links

 Shaker Museum and Library, Chatham, NY
 Shaker furniture at the Art Complex Museum

Furniture
Furniture
History of furniture